Zharikovo is a rural locality (a selo) and the administrative center of Zharikovsky Selsoviet of Tambovsky District, Amur Oblast, Russia. The population was 610 as of 2018. There are 9 streets.

Geography 
Zharikovo is located on the Gilchin River, 11 km southwest of Tambovka (the district's administrative centre) by road. Kositsino is the nearest rural locality.

References 

Rural localities in Tambovsky District, Amur Oblast